The Parish Church of Our Lady of the Divine Shepherd is an 18th-century Roman Catholic church in the city of Divina Pastora, Sergipe, Brazil. The church venerates the Blessed Virgin Mary under her title Our Lady of the Divine Shepherd, also known as the Divina Pastora.

Architecture

The date 1782 is inscribed on the façade of the church, indicating its probable date of completion. 

The frontispiece of the church is typical of Jesuit church architecture of the Northeast Region of Brazil. Divina Pastora is noted for its artwork by the Bahian artist José Teófilo de Jesus (1758-1847), who created a perspective painting on the ceiling of the nave depicting the Divina Pastora. Porticos along the exterior of the nave were created to shelter pilgrims. Similar porticos are found at Church of Nosso Senhor do Bonfim, Salvador, constructed in 1740 in Salvador, Bahia.

Protected status
The parish church was listed as a historic structure by National Institute of Historic and Artistic Heritage (IPHAN) in 1943. Both the structure and its contents were included in the IPHAN directive, which include Book of Historical Works, Inscription 195 and Book of Fine Arts, Inscription 261-A. Both directives are dated March 20, 1943.

See also
Catholic Church in Brazil

References

Baroque church buildings in Brazil
Roman Catholic churches in Sergipe
18th-century Roman Catholic church buildings in Brazil
National heritage sites of Sergipe
Roman Catholic churches completed in 1782
Portuguese colonial architecture in Brazil
Buildings and structures in Sergipe
1782 establishments in the Portuguese Empire